House of Women is a 1962 American crime drama directed by Crane Wilbur, starring Shirley Knight and Andrew Duggan. Walter Doniger, who was hired to direct the film, was fired and replaced by Wilbur 10 days into shooting.

Plot
Erica Hayden (Knight) is a young expectant mother wrongly implicated in a crime and sent to prison for five years. Erica learns that she must find a guardian for her daughter or she will become a ward of the state. Frank Cole, the warden, becomes infatuated with Erica and effectively blocks her chances for parole.

When another inmate's child dies, the woman becomes deranged. Erica prevents a tragedy and earns the right to be freed to be with her daughter, and Warden Cole's unethical methods come to light.

Cast
 Shirley Knight as Erica Hayden  
 Andrew Duggan as Warden Frank Cole  
 Constance Ford as Sophie Brice  
 Barbara Nichols as Candy Kane  
 Margaret Hayes as Zoe Stoughton  
 Jeanne Cooper as Helen Jennings  
 Virginia Gregg as Mrs. Hunter  
 Patricia Huston as Doris  
 Jason Evers as Dr. F.M. Conrad  
 Jennifer Howard as Addie Gates  
 Caroline Richter as Clemens  
 Gayla Graves as Jackie  
 Colette Jackson as Aggie  
 Jacqueline Scott as Mrs. Stevens  
 Paul Lambert as Richard Dunn
 Lyle Latell as Sam

See also

 List of American films of 1962

References

External links 
 
 
 
 
 

1962 films
1962 crime drama films
American crime drama films
American black-and-white films
Films directed by Crane Wilbur
Warner Bros. films
Women in prison films
1960s English-language films
1960s American films